Santiago Rodríguez is a province in the northwest region of the Dominican Republic. It was split from Monte Cristi in 1948. The Santiago Rodríguez province has the Monte Cristi and Valverde provinces to the north, the Santiago province to the east, the San Juan and Elías Piña provinces to the south and the Dajabón province to the west.

Geography
The province of Santiago Rodríguez presents a rugged relief with characteristics such as mountains, forests, hills, savannas and valleys all around. To the north, and separating it from the great Cibao valley, a formation composed of xerophilous vegetation known as the "Sierra Zamba" is observed.

Wide canyons formed by the two rivers that drain the area, the Cana and the Gurabo, have formed and shaped a landscape composed of narrow gorges and ravines that embellish the topography of the region. In the south, the Central Mountain Range rises imposing itself on the Northeast landscape.

Climate
The province of Santiago Rodríguez has a variable altitude from 159 m s. n. m. in the city of San Ignacio de Sabaneta up to more than 2000 m s. n. m. in mountainous areas. It has a tropical humid forest climate at the foot of the Cordillera Central, dry subtropical north of the Sierra Zamba, tropical semi-humid in the center and temperate humid in the high mountainous areas of the Cordillera Central.

There are two rainy seasons a year, May–June and September–October, with May being the rainiest month. The average annual temperature is 25 °C in the lowlands and 16 °C in the mountainous plains.

The province of Santiago Rodríguez is the richest of the Northwest provinces in terms of hydrographic basins. Three of the most important rivers in the country are born in its territory: Mao, Artibonito and Guayubín.

History

The capital town of the province was founded in 1844 by Santiago Rodríguez, who was an officer of the Dominican army in the Dominican War of Independence. He was one of the founders of the city of Sabaneta and an important military leader during the initial stages of the Restoration War (1863–1865). Sabaneta was the centre of the fight against the Spanish soldiers during this war. In 1854, the town was elevated to the category of Military Post and in 1858 it was incorporated into a municipality of the Santiago province.

When 1879 Monte Cristi became a province, San Ignacio de Sabaneta was made a municipality of that new province. When the new province of Santiago Rodríguez was created in 1948, San Ignacio de Sabaneta was made the head municipality of the province. On March 23, 1898, the President of the Republic at that time, Ulises Heureaux, under decree No. 3799 assigned the name of Monción, in honor of the hero of the Dominican Restoration War, General Benito Monción.4 In In 1907, Monción became the official municipality of the province of Monte Cristi. Then, in 1948, when the Province of Santiago Rodríguez was created, it became its municipality. It is found specifically in the southwestern part of the province.

Municipalities

The province as of June 20, 2006 is divided into the following municipalities (municipios):
San Ignacio de Sabaneta, provincial capital
Monción
Villa Los Almácigos

The following is a sortable table of the municipalities with population figures as of the 2012 census.

For comparison with the municipalities and municipal districts of other provinces see the list of municipalities and municipal districts of the Dominican Republic.

Economy 
Currently, the province has companies such as San Miguel del Caribe (Kola Real) and Mega Plax, making it an important commercial center in the region. The main economic activity in the province is agricultural production.

Although tourism has not developed as in other areas of the country, the province has ecotourism potential due to the high quality offered by its mountain landscapes, rivers and mild climate. Its main attractions are the mountains, including the Armando Bermúdez National Park area. The places of La Leonor, El Aguacate, Boca de los Mao, Cenovi, Lomita de La Cidra, La Peonía, El Burende and Palo Amarillo offer a warm and pleasant environment. Monte Gallo with 1840 meters of elevation and nestled in the national park, offers an extraordinary landscape. The installation of industries in the province is notable in recent years, favoring economic development.

According to the latest studies presented, the province is currently one of the highest human development index in the Dominican Republic. Santiago Rodriguez is a province of the Dominican Republic that has interesting tourist attraction, located mainly in the mountains. San Ignacio de Sabaneta, the main town is a beautiful and clean city, one of the nicest places of the Dominican Republic. The town has several parks, boulevards and a quiet atmosphere.

Just a few miles away, the visitor is going to find hills, mountains and one of the wildest places of the caribbean nature, that is Armando Bermudez National Park. This national park has rivers, mountain streams, and great variety of plants, birds and wildlife. One of the biggest attractions are the interminable pine trees, the largest stronghold of primary forest in the country. Next to this park is Moncion Damn or Presa de Moncion, an artificial lake surrounded by hills and mountains. Its deep blue waters are rich in fish.

References

External links
  Oficina Nacional de Estadística, Maps with administrative division of the provinces of the Dominican Republic, downloadable in PDF format

 
Provinces of the Dominican Republic
States and territories established in 1948